The Bombay Art Society is a non-profit art organization based in Mumbai. The institution was founded in 1888 for encouraging and promoting art. Most of the renowned artists on India's art scene have been associated with the Bombay Art Society in some way.

History

For some five or six years after the foundation of the Society in 1888, the Exhibits of the European Artists preponderated over those of the Indian Artists as shown by the catalogues of the Annual Exhibitions. This was natural as The Sir J.J. School of Art was then in its first stages of development, but in course of time as taste for the acquisition of art as a profession was developed under able Principals of the School of Art, like Messrs. Terry, and Griffiths, and by the publicity given to Indian Artists by the Bombay Art Society, the School of Art produced a band of Indian Artists. The number of works by Indian Artists exhibited in subsequent years at the Society's Annual Exhibition later considerably increased, while under British Rule.

Advancements 
The society has operated in the Jehangir Art Gallery since 1952, which is also the regular venue for the Society's Annual Exhibitions. During the Society's Centenary year in 1990 veteran artist and the then president of the Society K. K. Hebbar and the committee took the initiative for the complex. The then Chief Minister of Maharashtra Shri  Sharad Pawar through has given a piece of land in Bandra, Mumbai for the Society's complex which is now ready.

The Bombay Art Society's Art Complex houses three Exhibition Galleries, Auditorium and  Art Books Library. The Art Galleries are rented on weekly basis at affordable charges to Artists and Art Institutions for Exhibitions.

A number of awards and medals are given by the society. The Bendre-Husain Scholarship for encouraging and supporting emerging artists, instituted in 1989/1990, was donated by artist M.F. Husain. 
Recipients of the Roopadhar award for lifetime achievement include Sadanand Bakre (2004) and Tyeb Mehta (2007).

Architecture and design

The building designed on the lines of Cubist sculptures and resembling European expressionist architecture, house three galleries.

Managing committee 2021-2026
Rajendra Patil - President
Manoj Joshi - Vice-President
Prof. Narendra Vichare - Chairman
Chandrajit Yadav - Secretary
Ajinkya Chaulkar - Joint Secretary
Surendra Jagtap - Treasurer
Prof. Anil Naik
Ajinkya Chaulkar
Vikrant Manjrekar
Ganpat Bhadke
Madhavi Gangan
Shrikant Kadam
Vielas Salunkke
Anil Abhange

References

External links
 Bombay Art Society
 Latest News 15 May 2010
 http://architexturez.net/doc/az-cf-167380?qt-az_cf_core_recommended_content_t=1
 http://www.maharashtratourism.net/museums/jehangir-art-gallery.html
 http://bandra.info/bombay-arts-society-prepares-to-open-soon-at-bandra-reclamation/

Organisations based in Mumbai
Arts organisations based in India
Culture of Mumbai
Art societies
1888 establishments in India
Arts organizations established in 1888